Visitors to Venezuela must obtain a visa from one of the Venezuelan diplomatic missions unless they come from one of the visa exempt countries. Visitors are required to hold proof of sufficient funds to cover their stay and documents required for their next destination. Visitors not holding return/onward tickets could be refused entry. Naturalized Venezuelan citizens, must hold in addition to their passport and National Identity Card (Cedula de Identidad), the original (or certified copy) of the official decree (Gaceta Oficial) of their naturalization issued by the Venezuelan government. All visitors must hold a passport valid for 6 months.

Visa policy map

Visa-free entry
Holders of ordinary passports of the following 70 jurisdictions can visit Venezuela without a visa for up to 90 days for tourism purposes unless otherwise stated (extendable once for the same period except the citizens of Bolivia and Colombia):

ID - citizens of these countries may cross the border with an ID card only when travelling as tourists.
1 - must hold confirmation of hotel reservation or notarized invitation letter.
2 - for a maximum stay of 90 days in 180 days.
B - may also visit without a visa for business purposes

Visa waiver agreements were signed with 

and 
 and they are yet to come into force.

Visa exemption for 90 days also applies to holders of both diplomatic or service category passports of Algeria, Angola, Argentina, Austria, Barbados, Belarus, Belize, Bolivia, Brazil, Bulgaria, Chile, Costa Rica, Cuba, Czech Republic, Ecuador, El Salvador, France, Gambia, Germany, Guatemala, Guinea, Guyana, Honduras, Hungary, India, Israel, Jamaica, Latvia, Lebanon, Libya, Lithuania, Mexico, Namibia, Nicaragua, Panama, Peru, Philippines, Poland, Romania, Russia, Serbia Slovakia, South Korea, Spain, Switzerland, Syria, Trinidad and Tobago, United Kingdom, Uruguay, Vietnam and for holders of diplomatic passports only of Colombia, Italy, Portugal, Qatar and Suriname.

Visa exemption for 30 days applies to holders of diplomatic or service passports of China, Indonesia, Iran and Turkey, as well as passports for public affairs issued by China.

See also

Visa requirements for Venezuelan citizens
List of diplomatic missions of Venezuela

References

External links 
Visa policy of Venezuela, Ministry of Foreign Affairs of Venezuela 
The Embassy of Venezuela in the United States of America; also available in Spanish.

Venezuela
Foreign relations of Venezuela